HNoMS Vale was a Vale-class Rendel gunboat built for the Royal Norwegian Navy at Karljohansvern Naval Yard in 1874. She was one of a class of five gunboats - the other ships in the class was Brage, Nor, Uller and Vidar.

Vale was, in addition to the heavy, muzzle-loading main gun, armed with a small 'Quick Fire' gun and a 37mm Hotchkiss Revolving Cannon (broadly similar to the Gatling gun).

Later Vale and her sister ships was rebuilt as mine layers, and she served in this role when the Germans invaded in 1940. During the Norwegian Campaign she served mainly in the Sognefjord. She was captured by German forces after the surrender of Norwegian forces in southern Norway, and returned to Norway after the war.

The vessel was built at the Naval Yard at Horten, and had yard number 54.

External links
 Naval history via Flix: KNM Vale, retrieved 14 Feb 2006

Vale-class gunboats
Ships built in Horten
1874 ships
World War II minelayers of Norway
Naval ships of Norway captured by Germany during World War II
Minelayers of the Kriegsmarine
World War II minelayers of Germany